The Fraser Basin Council is a charitable non-profit organization devoted to advancing sustainability in the Fraser Basin and across BC. The mandate of the organization is, "To advance sustainability in British Columbia, with a core focus on the Fraser River Basin."

The Council has 38 Directors: an "impartial" Chairperson and 37 Directors representing the four orders of government (federal, provincial, local and First Nations), the private sector and civil society. Decisions are by consensus. The Fraser Basin Council serves as facilitator and educator, partnering with others on sustainability issues and initiatives, including flood management, smart planning for communities, climate change action and adaptation, air quality improvement, green fleets, healthy watersheds, sustainable fisheries, and sustainability reporting and education.

The touchstone of the Fraser Basin Council's work is its Charter for Sustainability, developed in 1997 by the council's predecessor, the Fraser Basin Management Board. The Charter defines sustainability as: "Living and managing activities in a way that balances social, economic, environmental and institutional considerations to meet our needs and those of future generations."

References

External links 
Fraser Basin Council website
Fraser Basin Council Charter for Sustainability
Environmental organizations based in British Columbia
Non-profit organizations based in British Columbia

Fraser River